O Sonho de Ser Uma Popstar is a 2002 video album by Brazilian girl group Rouge. The DVD was recorded at on Via Funchal in São Paulo, on August 31, 2002, presented the group's first show.

Track listing

Awards

Notes

Rouge (group) albums
Live albums by Brazilian artists
Portuguese-language video albums
Live video albums
2002 video albums